WYFH (90.7 FM) is a radio station broadcasting a Religious format. Licensed to North Charleston, South Carolina, United States, it serves the Charleston area.  The station is currently owned by Bible Broadcasting Network, Inc..

External links

YFH
Bible Broadcasting Network
YFH
Radio stations established in 1984